St. George's Protestant Episcopal Church, also known as St. George's Episcopal/Anglican Church, is a historic Episcopal church at 800 Marcy Avenue in Bedford-Stuyvesant, Brooklyn, in New York City. It was built in 1887 in the Gothic Revival style.  It is constructed of red brick with light stone trim in a cruciform plan. Attached to the church is a small, one story Sunday school building. It was designed by architect Richard M. Upjohn (1828-1903).

It was listed on the National Register of Historic Places in 1983. The church continues to hold weekly worship services and Bible studies.

See also
List of New York City Designated Landmarks in Brooklyn
National Register of Historic Places listings in Kings County, New York

References

External links
Official Website

Episcopal church buildings in New York City
Properties of religious function on the National Register of Historic Places in Brooklyn
Gothic Revival church buildings in New York City
Churches completed in 1887
New York City Designated Landmarks in Brooklyn
19th-century Episcopal church buildings
Churches in Brooklyn
Richard Michell Upjohn church buildings